"Jocko Homo" is the B-side to Devo's first single, "Mongoloid", released in 1977 on Devo's own label, Booji Boy Records and later released in the UK on Stiff Records. The song was re-recorded as the feature song for Devo's first album, Q: Are We Not Men? A: We Are Devo! on Warner Bros. Records in 1978. The original version peaked at No. 62 on the UK Singles Chart. It is based  on a chant from the 1932 movie Island of Lost Souls. "Jocko Homo" introduced the call-and-response "Are we not men?" / "We are Devo!" It is generally considered to be Devo's anthem. The title is taken from a 1924 anti-evolution tract called Jocko-Homo Heavenbound by Bertram Henry Shadduck, where it is explained as meaning "ape-man". The song had been in Devo's setlists for several years prior to being recorded, and an early version was featured in the band's 1976 short film The Truth About De-Evolution.

Background 
According to the liner notes of Hardcore Devo, "Jocko Homo" was first demoed in 1974, as one of Mark Mothersbaugh's first solo compositions for the group. The earliest known live performance of the song was on Halloween night of 1975, the released recording of this version is seven minutes long, although Mothersbaugh recalled it being 25 minutes when talking on the subject in 1997.

Between 1975 and 1976, Devo filmed The Truth About De-Evolution, a short experimental film, part of which was set to the 1974 demo of "Jocko Homo."

The next recorded live performance of the track was from February of 1977, where Devo performed a seven + minute version (which is cut off by a fade out on the tape.)

Song lyrics and themes
The song's verses primarily concern themselves with the view of de-evolution, noting foibles in human society. Most versions include a bridge that begins with "God made man, but he used the monkey to do it..." This is a response and reference to the Uncle Dave Macon song "The Bible's True" (1926), an anti-evolution song. The song also contains several call and response choruses, including the repeated chant "Are we not Men? / We are Devo!"

"Jocko Homo", in its variations, has also contained other chants between the main verses and the closing chant. These include "We Accept You / We Reject You / One of us! One of us!" (a reference to Tod Browning's Freaks) and "I've got a rhyme that comes in a riddle / O-Hi-O! / What's round on the ends and high in the middle? / O-Hi-O!", which references Devo's home state of Ohio.

The song begins in the unusual time signature of  time, but switches partway through to common  time for the call and response sections.

The original version of "Jocko Homo" lacks all call and response choruses except "Are we not men?", as well as the "God made man" bridge. This demo version appears on the Hardcore Devo: Volume One compilation, and the Devo's Greatest Misses compilation as well. The Booji Boy Records single version contains both the "O-Hi-O!" and the "God made man" bridge. The version on Q: Are We Not Men? A: We Are DEVO! only includes the "God made man" bridge.

Co-writer Mark Mothersbaugh attributes the line "Are we not men?" to the 1932 film Island of Lost Souls, an adaptation of the 1896 H. G. Wells novel Island of Doctor Moreau, from which the line actually originated. Mothersbaugh says of the film: "There were like, watered down, wussy versions of it in the later Islands Of Dr. Moreau stuff, but that was a really intense movie."

Music video
A music video for the song "Jocko Homo" was part of the short film, The Truth About De-Evolution, Devo's first music video, directed by Chuck Statler. It begins with an interstitial scene of Booji Boy running through a Cuyahoga Falls parking lot, up a fire escape, and into a building. There, he meets with General Boy, who is played by Mark Mothersbaugh's father (Robert Mothersbaugh, Sr.), and hands him papers. After an announcement from General Boy, there are a series of rapid fire cuts of the letters "D-E-V-O" set to the intro of the Devo song "Mechanical Man," and then the main video begins. In it, Mark Mothersbaugh plays a professor, lecturing to a class of students in surgical masks, caps, and 3-D glasses. As the song progresses, the class begins to riot.

Live performances
When asked to open for Sun Ra, as a joke they performed a half-hour rendition of the song to annoy the crowd, according to Mark Mothersbaugh in an interview in 1997: "We'd play "Jocko Homo" for 30 minutes, and we wouldn't stop until people were actually fighting with us, trying to make us stop playing the song. We'd just keep going, "Are we not men? We are Devo!" for like 25 minutes, directed at people in an aggressive enough manner that even the most peace-lovin' hippie wanted to throw fists."

Other versions
The version from the film The Truth About De-Evolution (1977) has a slower time than the album versions and lacks the bridges (like "God made man..." and "O-Hi-O").

On the 1988 and 1990 tours, as well as at the 1996 Park City, Utah show and the 2002 Hollywood, CA show, Devo performed a drastically re-arranged and slowed down acoustic version of "Jocko Homo" (known as the "Sad" version). On the 1990 tour, the band would finish the "Sad" version and switch into the regular performance version of the song. The "Sad" version can be heard on Now It Can Be Told: DEVO at the Palace. Following the band's reunion, the "Sad" version would be played only once, during the 1996 Sundance Festival concert.

An "E-Z Listening" version was recorded in a Caribbean style for playback before shows. This appears on the 1987 E-Z Listening Disc.

In 1979, novelty group Lonnie & the Devotions recorded a cover version, in a barbershop quartet style, for Rhino Records' early Devo tribute album KROQ's Devotees.

Parodist "Weird Al" Yankovic included a portion of this song in his first polka medley titled "Polkas on 45". His DEVO parody "Dare to Be Stupid" is considered by Mark Mothersbaugh to be an accurate pastiche of their song style.

French band Justice sampled the opening synth riff of the music video version in their song "Stress" in their debut album, †.

US band Thanatos included a very tongue-in-cheek cover of this song as a hidden track on the album This Endless Night Inside.

Charts

Further reading

References

1978 singles
Devo songs
Song recordings produced by Brian Eno
Songs written by Mark Mothersbaugh
Stiff Records singles
1978 songs
Warner Records singles